The 26th Cannes Film Festival was held from 10 to 25 May 1973. The Grand Prix du Festival International du Film went to Scarecrow by Jerry Schatzberg and The Hireling by Alan Bridges. At this festival two new non-competitive sections were added: 'Étude et documents' and 'Perspectives du Cinéma Français' (which is started by the French Film Directors' Society and runs until 1991).

The festival opened with Godspell, directed by David Greene and closed with Lady Sings the Blues, directed by Sidney J. Furie. Swastika, a documentary by Philippe Mora, got negative reactions and caused disturbance among audience by showing Adolf Hitler's daily and social life. The Holy Mountain by Alejandro Jodorowsky, created controversy at the festival due to its depiction of extreme violence.

Jury 
The following people were appointed as the Jury of the 1973 feature film competition:

Feature films
Ingrid Bergman (Sweden) Jury President
Jean Delannoy (France)
Lawrence Durrell (UK)
Rodolfo Echeverría (Mexico)
Bolesław Michałek (Poland) (critic)
François Nourissier (France)
Leo Pestelli (Italy) (journalist)
Sydney Pollack (USA)
Robert Rozhdestvensky (Soviet Union) (author)
Short films
Robert Enrico (France) President
Samuel Lachize (France) (critic)
Alexandre Marin

Official selection

In competition - Feature film
The following feature films competed for the Grand Prix International du Festival:

Anna and the Wolves (Ana y los lobos) directed by Carlos Saura
Belle directed by André Delvaux
The Death of a Lumberjack (La Mort d'un bûcheron) directed by Gilles Carle
The Effect of Gamma Rays on Man-in-the-Moon Marigolds directed by Paul Newman
Electra Glide in Blue directed by James William Guercio
Fantastic Planet (La Planète sauvage) directed by René Laloux
Far West (Le Far-West) directed by Jacques Brel
Godspell directed by David Greene
La Grande Bouffe directed by Marco Ferreri
The Hireling directed by Alan Bridges
Hospitals: The White Mafia (Bisturi, la mafia bianca) directed by Luigi Zampa
The Hour-Glass Sanatorium (Sanatorium Pod Klepsydrą) directed by Wojciech Jerzy Has
The Invitation (L'Invitation) directed by Claude Goretta
Jeremy directed by Arthur Barron
Love and Anarchy (Film d'amore e d'anarchia, ovvero: stamattina alle 10, in via dei Fiori, nella nota casa di tolleranza...) directed by Lina Wertmüller
The Mother and the Whore (La maman et la putain) directed by Jean Eustache
Monologue (Monolog) directed by Ilya Averbakh
O Lucky Man! directed by Lindsay Anderson
One Hamlet Less (Un Amleto di meno) directed by Carmelo Bene
La otra imagen directed by Antoni Ribas
Petőfi '73 directed by Ferenc Kardos
Scarecrow directed by Jerry Schatzberg
The Vows (A Promessa) directed by António de Macedo
We Want the Colonels (Vogliamo i colonnelli) directed by Mario Monicelli

Films out of competition
The following films were selected to be screened out of competition:

 Cries and Whispers (Viskningar och rop) directed by Ingmar Bergman
 Day for Night (La Nuit Américaine) directed by François Truffaut
 A Doll's House directed by Joseph Losey
 Future Shock directed by Alex Grasshoff
 The Holy Mountain directed by Alejandro Jodorowsky
 Lady Sings the Blues directed by Sidney J. Furie
 Lo Païs directed by Gérard Guérin
 Olivier Messiaen et les Oiseaux directed by Michel Fano, Denise Tual
 Picasso, Peintre Du Siècle 1900-1973 directed by Lauro Venturi
 Story of a Love Story (L'Impossible Objet) directed by John Frankenheimer
 Swastika directed by Philippe Mora
 Visions of Eight directed by Miloš Forman, Claude Lelouch, Yuri Ozerov, Mai Zetterling, Kon Ichikawa, John Schlesinger, Arthur Penn, Michael Pfleghar
 Wattstax directed by Mel Stuart
 We Can't Go Home Again directed by Nicholas Ray

Short film competition
The following short films competed for the Short Film Palme d'Or:

Az 1812-es év by Sándor Reisenbüchler
Balablok by Břetislav Pojar
Langage du geste by Kamal El Sheikh
La Ligne de sceaux by Jean-Paul Torok
Skagen 1972 by Claus Weeke
Space Boy by Renate Druks
La Tête by Emile Bourget

Parallel sections

International Critics' Week
The following feature films were screened for the 12th International Critics' Week (12e Semaine de la Critique):

 Le Charbonnier by Mohamed Bouamari (Algeria)
 The Water Was So Clear (Gaki zoshi) by Yoichi Takabayashi (Japan)
 Ganja & Hess by Bill Gunn (United States)
 Kashima Paradise by Yann Le Masson, Bénie Deswarte (France)
 Enough Praying (Ya no basta con rezar) by Aldo Francia (Chile)
 Vivre ensemble by Anna Karina (France)
 Non ho tempo by Ansano Giannarelli (Italy)
 Nunta de piatră by Mircea Veroiu, Dan Pita (Romania)

Directors' Fortnight
The following films were screened for the 1973 Directors' Fortnight (Quinzaine des Réalizateurs):

 Aguirre, the Wrath of God (Aguirre, der Zorn Gottes) by Werner Herzog (West Germany)
 The Sparrow (Al Ousfour) by Youssef Chahine (Egypt)
 All Nudity Shall Be Punished (Toda Nudez Sera Castigada) by Arnaldo Jabor (Brazil)
 Black Holiday (La villeggiatura) by Marco Leto (Italy)
 La città del sole by Gianni Amelio (Italy)
 Coup d'Etat (Kaigenrei) by Yoshishige Yoshida (Japan)
 Days of '36 (Meres tou '36) by Theo Angelopoulos (Greece)
 Desaster by Reinhard Hauff (West Germany)
 Drustvena Igra by Srdjan Karanovic (Yugoslavia)
 El Cambio by Alfredo Joskowicz (Mexico)
 Farlige Kys by Henrik Stangerup (Denmark)
 Hannibal by Xavier Koller (Switzerland)
 History Lessons (Geschichtsunterricht) by Jean-Marie Straub, Danièle Huillet (West Germany)
 Lovely Swine (Bel ordure) by Jean Marboeuf (France)
 Metamorfosis del jefe de la policía política by Helvio Soto (Chile)
 Payday by Daryl Duke (United States)
 Photography (Fotografia) by Pal Zolnay (Hungary)
 Quem é Beta? by Nelson Pereira Dos Santos (Brazil)
 Réjeanne Padovani by Denys Arcand (Canada)
 Some Call It Loving by James B. Harris (United States)
 The Sun Rises Once a Day (Słońce wschodzi raz na dzień) by Henryk Kluba (Poland)
 Touki Bouki by Djibril Diop Mambety (Senegal)
 A Season in the Life of Emmanuel (Une saison dans la vie d'Emmanuel) by Claude Weisz (France)
 La vita in gioco by Gianfranco Mingozzi (Italy)
 Wedding in White by William Fruet (Canada)
 Zwartziek by Jacob Bijl (Netherlands)

Short films

 Ein Leben by Herbert Schramm (West Germany)
 El hombre que va a misa by Bernardo Borenholtz (Argentina)
 Ermitage by Carmelo Bene (Italy)
 Fil a fil by Christian Paureilhe (France)
 Grey City by Farshid Meshgali (Iran)
 Introduction a la musique d'accompagnement by Jean-Marie Straub, Danièle Huillet (West Germany)
 L'audition by Jean-François Dion (France)
 La version originelle by Paul Dopff (France)
 Le lapin chasseur by Thomas Lehestre (France)
 Le soldat et les trois sœurs by Pascal Aubier (France)
 Le travail du comédien by Atahualpa Lichy (France)
 Le ventriloque by Carmelo Bene (Italy)
 Moc by Vlatko Gilic (Yugoslavia)
 Pourquoi by Jean-Denis Berenbaum (France)
 Rendez-vous romantique by Michka Gorki (France)
 Simplexes by Claude Huhardeaux (France)
 Take Off by Gunvor Nelson (United States)
 Zastave by Zoran Jovanovic (Yugoslavia)

Awards

Official awards
The following films and people received the 1973 Official selection awards:
Grand Prix du Festival International du Film:
The Hireling by Alan Bridges
Scarecrow by Jerry Schatzberg
Grand Prix Spécial du Jury: The Mother and the Whore (La maman et la putain) by Jean Eustache
Best Actress: Joanne Woodward for The Effect of Gamma Rays on Man-in-the-Moon Marigolds
Best Actor: Giancarlo Giannini for Film d'amore e d'anarchia, ovvero: stamattina alle 10, in via dei Fiori, nella nota casa di tolleranza...
Jury Prize:
Sanatorium Pod Klepsydrą by Wojciech Has
L'Invitation by Claude Goretta
Special Award: La Planète sauvage by René Laloux
Best First Work: Jeremy by Arthur Barron
Short films
Grand Prix International du Festival: Balablok by Břetislav Pojar
Prix spécial du Jury: Az 1812-es év by Sándor Reisenbüchler

Independent awards
FIPRESCI
FIPRESCI Prize:
La Grande Bouffe by Marco Ferreri
The Mother and the Whore (La maman et la putain) by Jean Eustache
Commission Supérieure Technique
 Technical Grand Prize: Cries and Whispers (Viskningar och rop) by Ingmar Bergman
OCIC Award
 Scarecrow by Jerry Schatzberg

References

Media
INA: Opening of the Cannes Film Festival (commentary in French)
INA: Interview with Jerry Schatzberg for Scarecrow (interview in French and English)

External links 
 1973 Cannes Film Festival (web.archive)
 Official website Retrospective 1973
 Cannes Film Festival Awards for 1973 at Internet Movie Database

Cannes Film Festival, 1973
Cannes Film Festival, 1973
Cannes Film Festival